ㅏ(a) is a jamo, the smallest component of the Korean hangul writing system. It represents a vowel, the IPA pronunciation of which is [ɐ]. 

The Unicode for ㅏ is U+314F.

Stroke order

References

See also
Turnstile (symbol)

Hangul jamo
Vowel letters